Maxim Rudolfovich Trunev (born September 7, 1990) is a Russian professional ice hockey winger who is currently playing for Saryarka Karaganda of the Supreme Hockey League (VHL).

Playing career
Trunev was brought up in the Cherepovets hockey system and first came to the attention of international scouts for his play at the 2006 Mac's Midget tournament in Canada where he was voted to the first team all star. Various scouting organizations pegged him as a possible 4th or 5th round draft choice in the 2008 NHL Entry Draft. He was eventually selected by the Montreal Canadiens in the 5th round with the 138th overall pick (previously acquired from the Calgary Flames). Trunev was selected 3rd overall by the Portland Winter Hawks of the WHL in the 2008 CHL Import Draft. Trunev was picked up by the Tri-City Americans after Portland dropped him from its protected list.

International play
Trunev played for Russia at the 2010 World Junior Championships.

Career statistics

Regular season and playoffs

International

Awards and honours

References

External links

1990 births
Living people
Admiral Vladivostok players
Lokomotiv Yaroslavl players
Montreal Canadiens draft picks
HC Neftekhimik Nizhnekamsk players
Russian ice hockey right wingers
Severstal Cherepovets players
HC Spartak Moscow players
Traktor Chelyabinsk players